Bobbili revenue division is an administrative division in the Vizianagaram district of the Indian state of Andhra Pradesh. It is one of the three revenue divisions in the district and comprises nine mandals. It was formed on 4 April 2022 by the Y. S. Jagan Mohan Reddy-led Government of Andhra Pradesh.

Mandalas
There are a total of 7 Mandals in Bobbili revenue division:
 Bobbili mandal
 Ramabhadrapuram mandal
 Badangi mandal
 Therlam mandal
 Gajapathinagaram mandal
 Dattirajeru mandal
 Mentada mandal

References

Revenue divisions in Vizianagaram district